Teneliximab is a chimeric monoclonal antibody binding to the immune stimulatory protein CD40. , it has not entered clinical trials.

References

Monoclonal antibodies